Gustaf Stiernspetz (20 October 1889 – 25 March 1966) was a Swedish sports shooter. He competed in men's 50 metre pistol event at the 1912 Summer Olympics.

References

1889 births
1966 deaths
Swedish male sport shooters
Olympic shooters of Sweden
Shooters at the 1912 Summer Olympics
Sport shooters from Stockholm